Amine Al-Sanini (born 1 January 1965 ) is a Yemeni former football goalkeeper who played for Al-Ahli San'a' and the Yemen national team.

Honours

Player
Al-Ahli San'a
 Yemeni League: 1981, 1983, 1984, 1988, 1992, 1994,

Manager
Yemen U17
 FIFA U-17 World Cup Group Stage: 2003
 AFC U-17 Championship runner-up: 2002

External links 
 

1965 births
Living people
Yemeni footballers
Yemen international footballers
Association football goalkeepers
Yemeni football managers
Yemen national football team managers
Footballers at the 1990 Asian Games
Al-Ahli Club Sana'a players
Yemeni League players
Asian Games competitors for Yemen